John Coghlan (27 November 1946 – 21 November 2016) was an Australian rules footballer who played with South Melbourne in the Victorian Football League (VFL).

Notes

External links 

1946 births
2016 deaths
Australian rules footballers from Victoria (Australia)
Sydney Swans players
Old Paradians Amateur Football Club players